Thyrocopa decipiens is a moth of the family Xyloryctidae. It was first described by Lord Walsingham in 1907. It is endemic to the Hawaiian islands of Oahu, Molokai, Maui and Hawaii.

The length of the forewings is 16–23 mm. Adults are on wing year round.

The larvae feed on Freycinetia arborea. The larvae feed in the tips of branches, eating the leaves of the unexpanded spindle. There may be a dozen or more feeding somewhat gregariously.

External links

Thyrocopa
Endemic moths of Hawaii
Moths described in 1907